The Mighty Ducks of Anaheim were founded in 1993 by The Walt Disney Company. The team's original name was chosen from the Disney movie The Mighty Ducks, based on a group of misfit kids who turn their losing youth hockey team into a winning team. Disney subsequently made an animated series called Mighty Ducks, featuring a fictional Mighty Ducks of Anaheim team that consisted of anthropomorphized ducks led by the Mighty Duck Wildwing. The team was the first tenant of Arrowhead Pond, a brand-new arena in Anaheim located a short distance east of Disneyland and across the Orange Freeway from Angel Stadium. The arena was completed the same year the team was founded. The Ducks did not qualify for the playoffs in their first year.

The Mighty Ducks hired Jack Ferreira as their first General Manager. Pierre Gauthier became his assistant. Gauthier had been a former goalie for Boston University and had considerable scouting experience with the New England Whalers, Calgary Flames and New York Rangers.

Offseason
Forward Troy Loney was named the franchise's first team captain.

Regular season

On October 8, the Mighty Ducks took the ice against the Detroit Red Wings. It was the first regular season game for the Mighty Ducks in franchise history and the first regular season game played at the Arrowhead Pond of Anaheim. The Ducks finished their inaugural season with 71 points (33–46–5), and set a record, along with the Florida Panthers, for the most wins for an expansion team.

The Mighty Ducks finished last in power-play goals for (54), power-play percentage (14.36%) and most times shut out (9).

Season standings

Schedule and results

Regular season

Player statistics

Skaters

Goaltenders

† Denotes player spent time with another team before joining the Mighty Ducks. Stats reflect time with the Mighty Ducks only.
‡ Denotes player was traded mid-season. Stats reflect time with the Mighty Ducks only.

Transactions

Trades

Free agents

Waivers

Draft picks

Expansion draft

Notes
 Lost in Expansion Draft phase two to the Tampa Bay Lightning and then traded to the New York Rangers for a third-round pick in the 1993 NHL Entry Draft.
 Lost in Expansion Draft phase two to the Ottawa Senators.

NHL draft
Anaheim's draft picks at the 1993 NHL Entry Draft held at Colisée de Québec in Quebec City, Quebec, Canada.

See also
 1993–94 NHL season

References

 Mighty Ducks on Hockey Database

Anaheim Ducks seasons
Anaheim
Anaheim
Mighty Ducks of Anaheim
Mighty Ducks of Anaheim